Richard Francis Smith (born 22 October 1967) is an English former professional footballer who played in the Football League for Mansfield Town and Wolverhampton Wanderers.

References

1967 births
Living people
English footballers
Association football forwards
English Football League players
Wolverhampton Wanderers F.C. players
Moor Green F.C. players
Mansfield Town F.C. players
Alvechurch F.C. players